203 Prince Street is an historic townhouse on Prince Street between MacDougal and Sullivan Streets in the SoHo neighborhood of Lower Manhattan, New York City. Built in 1834 with  stories on land that was once part of the estate of Aaron Burr, the house acquired an additional full story in 1888. Primarily constructed in the late Federal style, the building also has elements of the Greek Revival style.

The house was designated a New York City landmark in 1974, and was added to the National Register of Historic Places in 1983.

See also 
 National Register of Historic Places listings in New York County, New York
 List of New York City Designated Landmarks in Manhattan

References 
Notes

External links 

 House at 203 Prince Street, Archiplanet.com

Houses on the National Register of Historic Places in Manhattan
Houses completed in 1834
Houses completed in 1888
New York City Designated Landmarks in Manhattan
Federal architecture in New York City
Houses in Manhattan
SoHo, Manhattan